The director-general of the World Trade Organization is the officer of the World Trade Organization (WTO) responsible for supervising and directing the organization's administrative operations. Since the World Trade Organization's decisions are made by member states, either through a Ministerial Conference or through the General Council, the director-general has little power over matters of policy – the role is primarily advisory and managerial in nature. The director-general supervises the WTO secretariat of about 700 staff and is appointed by WTO members for a term of four years.

The post of Director-General had been vacant since 31 August 2020, after the resignation of Roberto Azevêdo of Brazil who had held the post since 1 September 2013. On February 5, 2021, Dr. Ngozi Okonjo-Iweala of Nigeria secured the support of the United States for Director-General of the WTO. Okonjo-Iweala assumed office on 1 March 2021, and became both the first woman and the first African to hold this position.

Before the formation of the WTO, the General Agreement on Tariffs and Trade (GATT) had a series of directors-general. Peter Sutherland was the last director-general of GATT and the first of the WTO.

List of directors-general
This is a list of former holders of the office of Director-General. The post was created in 1995, although the earlier office of Executive Secretary is often seen as a direct equivalent.

2020 director-general selection

In May 2020, Director-General Azevedo announced that he would step down on 31 August 2020, a year before his mandate was due to expire. On 17 August 2020, human rights organizations urged the member nations to reject the nomination of Saudi Arabia's Mohammad Al-Tuwaijri, citing the country's poor human rights records.

General Council Chair David Walker initiated a process of consultation with members from 7 September 2020 onwards, through which the field of candidates was gradually reduced until an appointment was to be made. Eight candidates were put forward by WTO member governments to succeed Azevedo.

The final selection required a consensus of the 164 member countries and was expected to take place in November, 2020. However, due to "the health situation and current events" the meeting was postponed.

References

External links

 
World Trade Organization